Homeland is an American espionage thriller television series developed by Howard Gordon and Alex Gansa, based on the Israeli series Prisoners of War created by Gideon Raff, who serves as an executive producer on Homeland. The series stars Claire Danes as Carrie Mathison, a CIA operations officer.  The first three seasons focus on Mathison's belief that an American prisoner of war, Nicholas Brody (Damian Lewis) was turned by the enemy, and now poses a significant risk to national security. The subsequent seasons follow Mathison's continued covert work. The series premiered on October 2, 2011 on Showtime, and concluded on April 26, 2020, after eight seasons and 96 episodes.

Series overview

Episodes

Season 1 (2011)

Season 2 (2012)

Season 3 (2013)

Season 4 (2014)

Season 5 (2015)

Season 6 (2017)

Season 7 (2018)

Season 8 (2020)

Home video releases

Ratings

References

External links
 
 

Lists of American drama television series episodes
Episodes